The following is a timeline of the history of the city of Pamplona, Spain.

Prior to 20th century

 74 BC - Pompaelo founded by Romans.
 68 BC - Pamplona rebuilt by Pompey the Great.
 5th century AD - Diocese of Pamplona established.
 466 AD - Visigoth Euric in power.
 542 - City taken by Frankish forces of Childebert.
 778 - City sacked by forces of Charlemagne.
 799 -  in power.
 806 - Franks in power.
 824 - Basque Íñigo Arista becomes King of Pamplona.
 907 - City besieged by Moorish forces.
 1124 - Pamplona Cathedral consecrated.
 1138 - City besieged by Castilian forces.
 1231 - San Nicolás church rebuilt.
 1297 - San Cernin church rebuilt.
 1397 - Beginning of construction of Pamplona Cathedral a late Gothic structure.
 1423 - Districts of Navarrería, Saint Sernin, and Saint Nicholas unified.
 1490 - Printing press in use.
 1512 - City becomes part of Castile.
 1556 - Hospital de Nuestra Senora de la Misericordia built.
 1569 - Citadel construction begins.
 1716 - Juan de Camargo y Angulo becomes Catholic bishop of Pamplona.
 1755 - City Hall rebuilt.
 1830 -  park laid out (approximate date).
 1836-40 - In the First Carlist War it was held by the Christinos
 1839 - Political demonstration.
 1857 - Population: 22,702.
 1875 - Attacked by the Carlists in the Third Carlist War, but not taken. 
 1881 - Hotel La Perla in business.
 1888 - City expanded by six blocks ("I Ensanche").
 1897 -  newspaper begins publication.
 1900 - Population: 28,886.

20th century

 1903 - Diario de Navarra newspaper begins publication.
 1915 - City walls partially dismantled; city expanded ("II Ensanche").
 1920
 CA Osasuna football team formed.
 Population: 32,635.
 1922 - Plaza de Toros de Pamplona (bullring) built.
 1923 -  newspaper begins publication.
 1939 - CD Iruña football club formed.
 1940 - CD Oberena football club formed.
 1952 - University of Navarra founded.
 1956 - Museum of Navarre, Pamplona (museum) opens.
 1958 - CD Pamplona football club formed.
 1960 - Population: 97,880.
 1967 - El Sadar Stadium opens.
 1970 - Population: 147,168.
 1978 - José María Cirarda Lachiondo becomes Catholic bishop of Pamplona.
 1979 -  becomes mayor.
 1982 -  newspaper begins publication.
 1987 - Universidad Pública de Navarra established.
 1988 -  radio begins broadcasting.
 1990 -  (musical group) formed.
 1991 - Population: 191,197.
 1993
 Diário de Notícias newspaper begins publication.
 Fernando Sebastián Aguilar becomes Catholic bishop of Pamplona.
 1995
 Democrats' Convergence of Navarre regional political party headquartered in city.
  becomes mayor.
 1998 - Pamplona City Transport in operation.
 1999 - Yolanda Barcina becomes mayor.
 2000 -  begins.

21st century

 2003 -  built.
 2005 - Punto de Vista International Documentary Film Festival begins.
 2007 - Nbici bikeshare program launched.
 2011 -  becomes mayor.

See also
 Pamplona history
 History of Pamplona
 
 List of municipalities in Navarre

References

This article incorporates information from the Spanish Wikipedia.

Bibliography
 
 
 
 
 
  (fiction set in Pamplona)

External links

 Map of Pamplona, 1943
 Europeana. Items related to Pamplona, various dates.
 Digital Public Library of America. Items related to Pamplona, various dates

Pamplona
pamplona